TERRA Environmental Research Institute is a secondary school in Miami, Florida, United States that opened in 2009. It is a LEED certified school.

This school has three magnet academies: Biomedical Research, Robotics & Engineering, and Environmental Research. Students have the option of supplementing their academy in the sophomore and junior year with the AP Capstone Program. The school was built to continue research while benefiting the environment. It offers many advanced programs, with some freshmen already being enrolled in Chemistry and Pre-Calculus the opening year.

Admissions
As a magnet school, TERRA requires a minimum GPA of 2.5 in all Core classes, a 2.0 GPA in conduct, and effort grades of 2 or higher on a 3 point scale. Applicants must also have taken Algebra I and Physical Science before their freshman year. No more than 10 unexcused absences are permissible for admissions.

Academics
Terra has an alternating three-block schedule, with a total of six class periods: One of these periods must be a course from the student's respective academy, four from their core classes (mathematics, language arts, science, and social studies), and one elective.

More than 20 Advanced Placement classes are offered across a variety of subjects, including: 
AP English Language and Composition
AP English Literature and Composition
AP Spanish Language and Culture
AP Spanish Literature and Culture
AP Calculus
AP Statistics
AP Biology
AP Chemistry
AP Environmental Science
AP World History: Modern
AP European History
AP United States History
AP Art History
AP Human Geography
AP Psychology
AP Studio Art

World languages
Florida students are required to earn two consecutive foreign language credits for graduation. TERRA offers courses in the Spanish language, French language, and Japanese language.

Performing and fine arts
Students are required to earn one credit in performing and fine arts for graduation. Choices include:
 T.V Production 
Drama
Stagecraft
 Art/2-D/3-D Comprehensive
 Advanced Placement Studio art
 Guitar, Band, and Chorus
 Speech and Debate

Uniform
All students are required to wear a school uniform, which consists of either a white or hunter green polo bearing the school logo, navy blue pants, along with an I.D. issued by the school. Belts and I.D.s must be worn at all times. Sweaters can be blue, green, or white, and must also include the school logo. Undershirts should be solid colors, and must be hunter green, navy blue, or white.

Student life 
Parking is available for students on campus with a student parking decal. Student decals are $10 cash.  Students can also join a club. The club fees vary but include HOSA (organization), VEX Robotics Competition, Student Government, and many others.

Athletics

Physical education
All students are required to earn one physical education credit for graduation. Physical education consists of extensive conditioning, running, and playing sports, as well learning about nutrition, health, and the human body.

Sports
Students at Terra may participate in a variety of sports, that include the following:

Fall Sports-
 For Girls: Volleyball, golf, cross-country, swimming and bowling
 For Boys: Golf, cross-country, swimming and bowling

Winter Sports-
 For Girls: Basketball and soccer
 For Boys: Basketball and soccer

Spring Sports-
 For Girls: Flag football, softball, badminton, tennis, and water polo
 For Boys: Baseball, volleyball, badminton, tennis, and water polo

References

High schools in Miami-Dade County, Florida
Magnet schools in Florida
Miami-Dade County Public Schools
Public high schools in Florida
2009 establishments in Florida
Educational institutions established in 2009